Vexillum (Vexillum) dennisoni, common name : the Dennison's mitre,  is a species of small sea snail, marine gastropod mollusk in the family Costellariidae, the ribbed miters.

Description
The shell size of the vexillum dennisoni varies between 40 mm and 66 mm

Distribution
This species is distributed in the seas along India and the Philippines.

References

 Turner H. 2001. Katalog der Familie Costellariidae Macdonald, 1860. Conchbooks. 1–100 page(s): 28

External links
 
 Reeve, L. A. (1844-1845). Monograph of the genus Mitra. In: Conchologia Iconica, or, illustrations of the shells of molluscous animals, vol. 2, pl. 1-39 and unpaginated text. L. Reeve & Co., London.

dennisoni
Gastropods described in 1844